This is a list of people elected Fellow of the Royal Society in 1927.

Fellows 

Sir Edward Victor Appleton
Thomas Graham Brown
Richard Higgins Burne
Sir James Chadwick
Gordon Miller Bourne Dobson
George Claridge Druce
Sebastian Ziani de Ferranti
James Pickering Kendall
Sir Patrick Playfair Laidlaw
Joseph William Mellor
Otto Rosenheim
Meghnad N Saha
John Sebastian Bach Stopford, Baron Stopford of Fallowfield
Herbert Henry Thomas
Charles Morley Wenyon

Statute 12 
Stanley Baldwin, 1st Earl Baldwin of Bewdley

1927
1927 in science
1927 in the United Kingdom